Samadhi is a 1950 Bollywood spy film directed by Ramesh Saigal. A box office success, the film was the highest earning film of 1950, earning an approximate gross of Rs. 1,35,00,000 and a net of Rs. 75,00,000.

Cast
Ashok Kumar as Shekhar 
Nalini Jaywant as Lily D'Souza 
Kuldip Kaur as Dolly D'Souza  
Shyam as Suresh 
Mubarak as Boss 
S. L. Puri 
Badri Prasad as Ram Prasad 
Shashi Kapoor as Pratap
N. Kabir
Collins as Netaji

Soundtrack
Lyrics were written by Rajinder Krishan. The song "Gore Gore O Banke Chore" is based on "Chico Chico from Puerto Rico" from the 1945 American film Doll Face.

References

External links
 

1950 films
1950s Hindi-language films
Films scored by C. Ramchandra
Indian spy films
Indian National Army in fiction
1950s spy films
Indian black-and-white films
Indian World War II films
Films directed by Ramesh Saigal